An  (also spelled ) is a braided ring-shaped bread that is boiled and sprinkled with salt and sesame or poppy seeds before being baked. It has a white, sweetish, moist and chewy crumb underneath a crunchy golden-brown crust. Traditionally sold from street carts, it is a popular snack in the Polish city of Kraków, where it has the status of a regional food with protected geographical indication. It is closely related to, but distinct from, bagels, bubliks and pretzels.

Etymology 
The term  is Polish. The adjective  denotes anything coming from or related to the city of Kraków.

Description 
An  is a ring-shaped baked product. It takes the form of an oval or, seldom, a circle with a hole in the middle. Its surface is formed by strands of dough, round or oval in cross-section, twisted into a spiral. The colour ranges from light golden to light brown, with a distinct sheen.

The visible strands of the spiral on the crust are firmish to the touch and the surface varies from smooth to slightly rough. The crumb inside is pale, soft and slightly moist. The taste is sweetish, which is typical of bakery products that are first parboiled and then baked.  are traditionally decorated by sprinkling them with various ingredients, including coarse salt, poppy seeds, sesame seeds, flax seeds, nigella seeds, mixed herbs or mixed spices (paprika, caraway, pepper), grated cheese, onion flakes, etc.

Ingredients and preparation 

Other ingredients, per  of flour, include: 
  of fat,
  of sugar,
  of yeast,
  of salt,
  of water.

The dough is prepared using the single-stage method. Once suitably mixed, the dough is set aside for initial rising, which may take from a few minutes in summer to an hour in winter. The dough is divided into small portions, which are rolled out and cut into strips. The baker twists two or three strips into a spiral and then forms a ring by twisting them around his hand and presses it against the table. The ring is placed on a board or mesh for proofing, and then parboiled in water with a temperature of at least  until it rises to the surface. The water may be sweetened with very small amounts of honey. The  is then decorated and baked.

Once it has cooled, an  may be placed in packaging. If packaged before it has cooled, it quickly loses its crunchiness and becomes rubbery.  are usually sold unpackaged and unlabelled.

History 

The earliest known references to  being baked in Kraków, Poland's former royal capital, appear in the accounts of the court of King Vladislaus II Jagiełło and his consort, Queen Hedwig. An entry dated to 2 March 1394 mentions the product using both its Polish name and its equivalent in Polish Medieval Latin, or "rings": "for the queen, for rings of  [], 1 ".

In 1496, King John Albert granted the bakers' guild of the city of Kraków a monopoly on baking white bread, including . This privilege was subsequently confirmed by all Polish kings up to John III Sobieski. Initially,  could be made only during Lent by bakers specially designated for that purpose by the guild. The guild issued a decree in 1611 regulating the sale of  inside the city walls and the choice of bakers who were allowed to sell them.

A radical change took place in the 19th century. On 22 January 1802, a decree was signed which stipulated that any baker had the right to bake  when it was his turn to do so. The bakers authorised to bake  were selected by the drawing of lots. The custom of drawing lots probably ended in 1849, there being no evidence that it continued after that date. This could mean that, over time, the rules were relaxed and any baker could make  on any day of the year, as is still the case today.
[ 
{"type": "ExternalData", "service": "geoshape", "ids": "Q31487",   "properties": { "fill": "#DAA520" } }, //Kraków city
{"type": "ExternalData", "service": "geoshape", "ids": "Q1164890", "properties": { "fill": "#DAA520" } }, //Kraków county
{"type": "ExternalData", "service": "geoshape", "ids": "Q609424" , "properties": { "fill": "#DAA520" } }  //Wieliczka county
]

 were sold from stalls which opened before 6 a.m. so that the inhabitants of Kraków could buy them freshly baked early in the morning. The guild monitored the quality and freshness of the products, eight of its members being responsible for carrying out checks on stalls. Any transgressions were severely punished. Eventually, people started selling  in other ways. As late as the 1950s, they were sold straight from wicker baskets.

In modern times,  have been sold not only in shops and bakeries, but also from street carts. There are between 170 and 180 such carts offering  in Kraków today. An average of almost 150,000 are sold on the Kraków market in a single day.

The  often features in campaigns to promote Kraków. As a well-known symbol of Kraków and Lesser Poland, it is often used in advertising aimed at locals and tourists alike. It always features at the  bread festival, an event that is held regularly in Kraków.

See also

 List of breads

References

Sources 
This article incorporates some text from Council Regulation (EC) No. 510/2006, "Obwarzanek krakowski" EC No.  as published by EUR-Lex. According to the website's copyright notice, "except where otherwise stated, reuse of the EUR-Lex data for commercial or non-commercial purposes is authorised provided the source is acknowledged ('© European Union, http://eur-lex.europa.eu/, 1998-2016'). The reuse policy of the European Commission is implemented by the Commission Decision of 12 December 2011."

Further reading

External links 
 10 Must-Have Foods from Polish Cities 

 

Culture in Kraków
Polish cuisine
Street food
Sweet breads
Yeast breads
Polish products with protected designation of origin